The 1996 San Diego mayoral election was held on Tuesday, March 26, 1996, to elect the mayor for San Diego. Incumbent mayor Susan Golding stood for reelection.

Municipal elections in California are officially non-partisan, though some candidates do receive funding and support from various political parties. The non-partisan primary was held Tuesday, March 26, 1996. Since the incumbent Golding received a majority of primary votes, she was reelected outright with no need for a runoff in the November general election.

Candidates

Susan Golding, Mayor of San Diego (Party preference: Republican)
Jim Bell, environmental designer (Party preference: Democratic)
Patrick Coleman, marketing consultant and retired police officer (Party preference: Democratic)
Loch David Crane, magician, college instructor, and perennial candidate
Jim Turner, civil engineer
Jim Hart, aircraft mechanic and perennial candidate (Party preference: Republican)

Campaign
Incumbent mayor Susan Golding was seen as an overwhelming favorite going into the election against five relatively unknown candidates with little prior political experience. She refused to participate in debates against her five challengers. On March 26, 1996, Golding received an overwhelming majority of the votes and was easily re-elected mayor.

Primary election results

General election
Because Golding won a majority of the votes in the March primary, there was no need for a runoff in the November general election.

References

1996
1996 California elections
1996 United States mayoral elections
1990s in San Diego
March 1996 events in the United States